The 2010 Atlantic Hockey Tournament was the 7th Atlantic Hockey Tournament played between March 5 and March 20, 2010 at campus locations and at the Blue Cross Arena in Rochester, New York. By winning the tournament, RIT received Atlantic Hockey's automatic bid to the 2010 NCAA Division I Men's Ice Hockey Tournament.

Format
The tournament featured four rounds of play. In the first round, the seventh and tenth seeds and eighth and ninth seeds played a single game with the winner advancing to the quarterfinals. There, the first seed and lower-ranked first-round winner, the second seed and higher-ranked first-round winner, the third and sixth seeds, and the fourth and fifth seeds played a best-of-three series, with the winner advancing to the semifinals. In the semifinals, the highest and lowest seeds and second-highest and second-lowest seeds played a single game each, with the winners advancing to the championship game. The tournament champion received an automatic bid to the 2010 NCAA Men's Division I Ice Hockey Tournament.

Regular season standings
Note: GP = Games played; W = Wins; L = Losses; T = Ties; PTS = Points; GF = Goals For; GA = Goals Against

Bracket

Note: * denotes overtime period(s)

Results

First round

(7) Holy Cross vs. (10) American International

(8) Bentley vs. (9) Connecticut

Quarterfinals

(1) RIT vs. (9) Connecticut

(2) Sacred Heart vs. (7) Holy Cross

(3) Air Force vs. (6) Army

(4) Mercyhurst vs. (5) Canisius

Semifinals

(1) RIT vs. (5) Canisius

(2) Sacred Heart vs. (3) Air Force

Championship

(1) RIT vs. (2) Sacred Heart

Tournament awards

All-Tournament Team
G Jared DeMichiel (RIT)
D Dan Ringwald (RIT)
D Chris Tanev (RIT)
F Tyler Brenner (RIT) 
F Patrick Knowlton (Sacred Heart)
F Cameron Burt* (RIT) 
* Most Valuable Player(s)

References

Atlantic Hockey Tournament
Atlantic Hockey Tournament